The Women's Giant Slalom in the 2023 FIS Alpine Skiing World Cup is currently scheduled to include ten events, including the final. The season was scheduled to open in Sölden, Austria on 22 October 2022, but the race was cancelled due to bad weather and rescheduled to Semmering, Austria on 27 December.  

The season was interrupted by the 2023 World Ski Championships in the linked resorts of Courchevel and Méribel, France from 6–19 February 2023. Although the Alpine Skiing branch of the International Ski Federation (FIS) conducts both the World Cup and the World Championships, the World Championships are organized by nation (a maximum of four skiers is generally permitted per nation), and (after 1970) the results count only for World Championship medals, not for World Cup points. Accordingly, the results in the World Championship are highlighted in blue and shown in this table by ordinal position only in each discipline. The women's giant slalom was held in Méribel on 16 February.

Season Summary
After six races, 2021 discipline champion Marta Bassino of Italy, who had podiumed in five of them (one win, two seconds, and two thirds), held a slim lead over 2019 discipline champion Mikaela Shiffrin of the United States, who had three wins, in the season standings.  However, Shiffrin's victory in the seventh race (her fourth win) not only propelled her into the discipline lead for the season but also broke Lindsey Vonn's all-time women's record for World Cup victories, as it was Shiffrin's 83rd overall win. Shiffrin's later victory in Åre, Sweden (her sixth giant slalom win of the season) gave her the season championship with one race remaining and also enabled her to tie two records: Ingemar Stenmark's all-time overall record of 86 World Cup wins, and Vreni Schneider's all-time women's record of 20 giant slalom victories.. 

Shiffrin then broke Schneider's women's record for giant slalom victories by winning the finals, her seventh World Cup victory in the discipline for the season and her 21st career victory in the discipline (but still trailing Stenmark, who had 46, as well as three other men: Marcel Hirscher (31), Ted Ligety (24), and Michael von Grünigen (23)).. Also, Switzerland's Lara Gut-Behrami, who finished fourth, moved past Bassino, who finished sixth, into second place in the discipline for the season. 

The World Cup finals took place on Sunday, 19 March 2023 in Soldeu, Andorra, which previously hosted the finals in 2019. Only the top 25 skiers in the World Cup giant slalom discipline and the winner of the Junior World Championship, plus any skiers who have scored at least 500 points in the World Cup overall classification for the season, were eligible to compete in the final, and only the top 15 earned World Cup points.

Standings

Legend

DNQ = Did Not Qualify for run 2
DNF1 = Did Not Finish run 1
DSQ1 = Disqualified run 1
DNF2 = Did Not Finish run 2
DSQ2 = Disqualified run 2
DNS2 = Did Not Start run 2

See also
 2023 Alpine Skiing World Cup – Women's summary rankings
 2023 Alpine Skiing World Cup – Women's Overall
 2023 Alpine Skiing World Cup – Women's Downhill
 2023 Alpine Skiing World Cup – Women's Super-G
 2023 Alpine Skiing World Cup – Women's Slalom
 World Cup scoring system

References

External links
 Alpine Skiing at FIS website

Women's giant slalom
FIS Alpine Ski World Cup women's giant slalom discipline titles